Liberté, égalité, fraternité, French for , is the national motto of France and the Republic of Haiti, and is an example of a tripartite motto. Although it finds its origins in the French Revolution, it was then only one motto among others and was not institutionalized until the Third Republic at the end of the 19th century. Debates concerning the compatibility and order of the three terms began at the same time as the Revolution. It is also the motto of the Grand Orient and the Grande Loge de France.

Origins during the French Revolution

Some claim that Camille Desmoulins in number 35 of Révolutions de France et de Brabant, published on July 26, 1790. Speaking of the festival of July 14, 1790, he described "the citizen-soldiers rushing into each other's arms, promising each other liberty, equality, fraternity." (French: les soldats-citoyens se précipiter dans les bras l’un de l’autre, en se promettant liberté, égalité, fraternité.)  invented the phrase, however it isn't confirmed as this is only the first official mention of the phrase.

Several months later, Maximilien Robespierre popularized the phrase in his speech "On the organization of the National Guard", on 5 December 1790, article XVI, which was disseminated widely throughout France by the popular Societies.

Credit for the motto has been given also to Antoine-François Momoro (1756–1794), a Parisian printer and Hébertist organizer, though in different context of foreign invasion and Federalist revolts in 1793, 
it was modified to "Unity, indivisibility of the Republic; liberty, equality, brotherhood or death" and suggested by a resolution of the Paris Commune (of which Momoro was elected member by his section du Théâtre-Français) on 29 June 1793 to be inscribed on Parisian house-fronts and imitated by the inhabitants of other cities. In 1839, the philosopher Pierre Leroux claimed it had been an anonymous and popular creation. The historian Mona Ozouf underlines that, although Liberté and Égalité were associated as a motto during the 18th century, Fraternité wasn't always included in it, and other terms, such as Amitié (Friendship), Charité (Charity) or Union were often added in its place.

The emphasis on Fraternité during the French Revolution led Olympe de Gouges, a female journalist, to write the Declaration of the Rights of Woman and of the Female Citizen as a response. The tripartite motto was neither a creative collection, nor really institutionalized by the Revolution. As soon as 1789, other terms were used, such as "la Nation, la Loi, le Roi" (The Nation, The Law, The King), or "Union, Force, Vertu" (Union, Strength, Virtue), a slogan used beforehand by masonic lodges, or "Force, Égalité, Justice" (Strength, Equality, Justice), "Liberté, Sûreté, Propriété" (Liberty, Security, Property), etc.

In other words, liberté, égalité, fraternité was only one slogan among many others. During the Jacobin revolutionary period, various mottos were used, such as liberté, unité, égalité (liberty, unity, equality); liberté, égalité, justice (liberty, equality, justice); liberté, raison, égalité (liberty, reason, equality), etc. The only solid association was that of liberté and égalité, fraternité being ignored by the Cahiers de doléances as well as by the 1789 Declaration of the Rights of Man and of the Citizen. It was only alluded to in the 1791 Constitution, as well as in Robespierre's draft Declaration of 1793, placed under the invocation of (in that order) égalité, liberté, sûreté and propriété (equality, liberty, safety, property—though it was used not as a motto, but as articles of declaration), as the possibility of a universal extension of the Declaration of Rights: "Men of all countries are brothers, he who oppresses one nation declares himself the enemy of all." It did not figure in the August 1793 Declaration.

The Declaration of the Rights of Man and of the Citizen of 1789 defined liberty in Article 4 as follows:

Equality, on the other hand, was defined by the Declaration in terms of judicial equality and merit-based entry to government (art. 6):

Liberté, égalité, fraternité actually finds its origins in a May 1791 proposition by the Club des Cordeliers, following a speech on the Army by the Marquis de Guichardin. A British marine held prisoner on the French ship Le Marat in 1794 wrote home in letters published in 1796:

The compatibility of liberté and égalité was not in doubt in the first days of the Revolution, and the problem of the antecedence of one term on the other not lifted. Thus, the Abbé Sieyès considered that only liberty ensured equality, unless the latter was to be the equality of all dominated by a despot; while liberty followed equality ensured by the rule of law. The abstract generality of law (theorized by Jean-Jacques Rousseau in his 1762 book The Social Contract) thus ensured the identification of liberty to equality, liberty being negatively defined as an independence from arbitrary rule, and equality considered abstractly in its judicial form.

This identification of liberty and equality became problematic during the Jacobin period, when equality was redefined (for instance by François-Noël Babeuf) as equality of results, and not only judicial equality of rights. Thus, Marc Antoine Baudot considered that French temperament inclined rather to equality than liberty, a theme which would be re-used by Pierre Louis Roederer and Alexis de Tocqueville, while Jacques Necker considered that an equal society could only be found on coercion.

The third term, fraternité, was the most problematic to insert in the triad, as it belonged to another sphere, that of moral obligations rather than rights, links rather than statutes, harmony rather than contract, and community rather than individuality. Various interpretations of fraternité existed. The first one, according to Mona Ozouf, was one of "fraternité de rébellion" (Fraternity of Rebellion), that is the union of the deputies in the Jeu de Paume Oath of June 1789, refusing the dissolution ordered by the King Louis XVI: "We swear never to separate ourselves from the National Assembly, and to reassemble wherever circumstances require, until the constitution of the realm is drawn up and fixed upon solid foundations." Fraternity was thus issued from Liberty and oriented by a common cause.

Another form of fraternité was that of the patriotic Church, which identified social links with religious links and based fraternity on Christian brotherhood. In this second sense, fraternité preceded both liberté and égalité, instead of following them as in the first sense. Thus, two senses of Fraternity: "one, that followed liberty and equality, was the object of a free pact; the other preceded liberty and equality as the mark on its work of the divine craftsman."

Another hesitation concerning the compatibility of the three terms arose from the opposition between liberty and equality as individualistic values, and fraternity as the realization of a happy community, devoid of any conflicts and opposed to any form of egotism. This fusional interpretation of Fraternity opposed it to the project of individual autonomy and manifested the precedence of Fraternity on individual will.

In this sense, it was sometimes associated with death, as in Fraternité, ou la Mort! (Fraternity or Death!), excluding liberty and even equality, by establishing a strong dichotomy between those who were brothers and those who were not (in the sense of "you are with me or against me", brother or foe). Louis de Saint-Just thus stigmatized Anarchasis Cloots' cosmopolitanism, declaring "Cloots liked the universe, except France."

With Thermidor and the execution of Robespierre, fraternité disappeared from the slogan, reduced to the two terms of liberty and equality, re-defined again as simple judicial equality and not as the equality upheld by the sentiment of fraternity. The First Consul (Napoleon Bonaparte) then established the motto liberté, ordre public (liberty, public order).

19th century
Following Napoleon's rule, the triptych dissolved itself, as none believed it possible to conciliate individual liberty and equality of rights with equality of results and fraternity. The idea of individual sovereignty and of natural rights possessed by man before being united in the collectivity contradicted the possibility of establishing a transparent and fraternal community. Liberals accepted liberty and equality, defining the latter as equality of rights and ignoring fraternity.

Early socialists rejected an independent conception of liberty, opposed to the social, and also despised equality, as they considered, as Fourier, that one had only to orchestrate individual discordances, to harmonize them, or they believed, as Saint-Simon, that equality contradicted equity by a brutal levelling of individualities. Utopian socialism thus only valued fraternity, which was, in Cabet's Icarie the sole commandment.

This opposition between liberals and socialists was mirrored in rival historical interpretations of the Revolution, liberals admiring 1789, and socialists 1793. The July Revolution of 1830, establishing a constitutional monarchy headed by Louis-Philippe, substituted ordre et liberté (order and liberty) to the Napoleonic motto Liberté, Ordre public. Despite this apparent disappearance of the triptych, the latter was still being thought in some underground circles, in Republican secret societies, masonic lodges such as the "Indivisible Trinity," far-left booklets or during the Canuts Revolt in Lyon. In 1834, the lawyer of the Society of the Rights of Man (Société des droits de l'homme), Dupont, a liberal sitting in the far-left during the July Monarchy, associated the three terms together in the Revue Républicaine which he edited:

The triptych resurfaced during the 1847 Campagne des Banquets, upheld for example in Lille by Ledru-Rollin.

Two interpretations had attempted to conciliate the three terms, beyond the antagonism between liberals and socialists. One was upheld by Catholic traditionalists, such as Chateaubriand or Ballanche, the other by socialist and republicans such as Pierre Leroux. Chateaubriand thus gave a Christian interpretation of the revolutionary motto, stating in the 1841 conclusion to his Mémoires d'outre-tombe:

Neither Chateaubriand nor Ballanche considered the three terms to be antagonistic. Rather, they took them for being the achievement of Christianity. On the other hand, Pierre Leroux did not disguise the difficulties of associating the three terms, but superated it by considering liberty as the aim, equality as the principle and fraternity as the means. Leroux thus ordered the motto as Liberty, Fraternity, Equality, an order also supported by Christian socialists, such as Buchez.

Against this new order of the triptych, Michelet supported the traditional order, maintaining the primordial importance of an original individualistic right. Michelet attempted to conciliate a rational communication with a fraternal communication, "right beyond right", and thus the rival traditions of socialism and liberalism. The republican tradition would strongly inspire itself from Michelet's synchretism.

1848 Revolution

With the 1848 February Revolution, the motto was officially adopted, mainly under the pressure of the people who had attempted to impose the red flag over the tricolor flag (the 1791 red flag was, however, the symbol of martial law and of order, not of insurrection). Lamartine opposed popular aspirations, and in exchange of the maintaining of the tricolor flag, conceded the Republican motto of Liberté, Égalité, Fraternité, written on the flag, on which a red rosette was also to be added.

Fraternity was then considered to resume and to contain both Liberty and Equality, being a form of civil religion (which, far from opposing itself to Christianity, was associated with it in 1848) establishing social links (as called for by Rousseau in the conclusion of the Social Contract).

However, Fraternity was not devoid of its previous sense of opposition between brothers and foes, images of blood haunting revolutionary Christian publications, taking in Lamennais' themes. Thus, the newspaper Le Christ républicain (The Republican Christ) developed the idea of the Christ bringing forth peace to the poor and war to the rich.

As soon as 6 January 1852, the future Napoleon III, first President of the Republic, ordered all prefects to erase the triptych from all official documents and buildings, conflated with insurrection and disorder. Auguste Comte applauded Napoleon, claiming equality to be the "symbol of metaphysical anarchism", and preferring to it his diptych "ordre et progrès" ("order and progress", which would then become the motto of Brazil, Ordem e Progresso). On the other hand, Proudhon criticized fraternity as an empty word, which he associated with idealistic dreams of Romanticism. He preferred to it the sole term of liberty.

Paris Commune and Third Republic
Pache, mayor of the Paris Commune, painted the formula "Liberté, Égalité, Fraternité, ou la mort" on the walls of the commune. It was only under the Third Republic that the motto was made official. It was then not dissociated with insurrection and revolutionary ardours, Opportunist Republicans such as Jules Ferry or Gambetta adapting it to the new political conditions. Larousse's Dictionnaire universel deprived fraternity of its "evangelistic halo" (Mona Ozouf), conflating it with solidarity and the welfare role of the state.

Some still opposed the Republican motto, such as the nationalist Charles Maurras in his Dictionnaire politique et critique, who claimed liberty to be an empty dream, equality an insanity, and only kept fraternity. Charles Péguy, renewing with Lamennais' thought, kept fraternity and liberty, excluding equality, seen as an abstract repartition between individuals reduced to homogeneity, opposing "fraternity" as a sentiment put in motion by "misery", while equality only interested itself, according to him, to the mathematical solution of the problem of "poverty."

Péguy identified Christian charity and socialist solidarity in this conception of fraternity. On the other hand, Georges Vacher de Lapouge, the most important French author of pseudo-scientific racism and supporter of eugenism, completely rejected the republican triptych, adopting another motto, "déterminisme, inégalité, sélection" (determinism, inequality, selection). But, according to Ozouf, the sole use of a triptych was the sign of the influence of the republican motto, despite it being corrupted in its opposite.

20th century

During the German occupation of France in World War II, this motto was replaced by the reactionary phrase "travail, famille, patrie" (work, family, fatherland) by Marshal Pétain, who became the leader of the new Vichy French government in 1940. Pétain had taken this motto from the colonel de la Rocque's Parti social français (PSF), although the latter considered it more appropriate for a movement than for a regime.

Indian polymath and social reformer B.R. Ambedkar quoted "I Like the Religion That Teaches Liberty, Equality, and Fraternity".
 
Following the Liberation, the Provisional Government of the French Republic (GPRF) re-established the Republican motto Liberté, égalité, fraternité, which is incorporated into both the 1946 and the 1958 French constitutions.

Other nations
Many other nations have adopted the French slogan of "liberty, equality, and fraternity" as an ideal. B.R. Ambedkar, the Chairman of the Drafting Committee of the Constitution of India, included these words in the preamble to the Constitution of India, in the year 1950. Since its founding, "Liberty, Equality and Brotherhood" has been the lemma of the Social Democratic Party of Denmark. In the United Kingdom the political party the Liberal Democrats refer to "the fundamental values of liberty, equality and community" in the preamble of the party's Federal Constitution, and this is printed on party membership cards.

The Philippine National Flag has a rectangular design that
consists of a white equilateral triangle, symbolizing liberty,
equality, and fraternity; a horizontal blue stripe for peace,
truth, and justice; and a horizontal red stripe for patriotism
and valor. In the center of the white triangle is an eight-
rayed golden sun symbolizing unity, freedom, people's
democracy, and sovereignty.

Some former colonies of the French Republic (such as Haiti, Chad, Niger, and Gabon) have adopted similar three-word mottos.

The idea of the slogan "Liberty, Equality, Fraternity" has also given an influence as natural law to the First Article of the Universal Declaration of Human Rights:

Culture
The term is referred to in the 1993-94 film trilogy Three Colours by Krzysztof Kieślowski.

"Libertad! Igualdad! Fraternidad!" is the title of an English-language poem by William Carlos Williams.

See also
List of political slogans
Give me liberty or give me death
Life, liberty, and property
Brotherhood and unity
Three Principles of the People
Travail, famille, patrie – the national motto of Vichy France
La Nation, la Loi, le Roi
Salazar's Estado Novo's motto Deus, Pátria e Família (meaning "God, Fatherland, and Family")

Notes

References

Further reading
 Mathijsen, Marita. "The emancipation of the past, as due to the Revolutionary French ideology of Liberté, Egalité, Fraternité." Free Access to the Past ed Lotte Jensen (Brill, 2010). 20–40.
 Roth, Guenther. "Durkheim and the principles of 1789: the issue of gender equality." Telos 1989.82 (1989): 71–88. 
 Sénac, Réjane. "The Contemporary Conversation about the French Connection "Liberté, égalité, fraternité": Neoliberal Equality and "Non-brothers." Revue Française de Civilisation Britannique. French Journal of British Studies 21.XXI-1 (2016). online

External links

Liberty, Equality, Fraternity on the website of the French Presidency
Slogan of the French Republic – Official French website (in English)

French words and phrases
Slogans
National mottos
National symbols of France
National symbols of Haiti
French political catchphrases
Liberty symbols
Human rights concepts
Political ideologies
Egalitarianism
Liberalism
Radicalism (historical)
Political campaigns
1790s neologisms